The 1992 Croatia Open was a men's tennis tournament played on outdoor clay courts in Umag, Croatia that was part of the World Series of the 1992 ATP Tour. It was the third edition of the tournament and was held from 24 August until 30 August 1992. First-seeded Thomas Muster won the singles title.

Finals

Singles

 Thomas Muster defeated  Franco Davín, 6–1, 4–6, 6–4
 It was Muster's 3rd singles title of the year and the 13th of his career.

Doubles

 David Prinosil /  Richard Vogel defeated  Sander Groen /  Lars Koslowski, 6–3, 6–7, 7–6

References

External links
 ITF tournament edition details

Croatia Open Umag
Croatia Open
1992 in Croatian tennis